Euphaedra compacta, the compacted Ceres forester, is a butterfly in the family Nymphalidae. It is found in Nigeria and Cameroon. The habitat consists of forests.

References

Butterflies described in 1997
compacta